The Kutaisi Auto Mechanical Plant (KAMP), formerly Kutaisi Automobile Plant or KAZ for short; is a truck factory located in Kutaisi, Georgia named in the Soviet Union in honour of Sergo Ordzhonikidze.

History

Construction began in 1945, using forced labor, notably Polish Home Army prisoners, with the first conveyor coming online with the first truck ZIS-150 (KAZ-150) coming off on August 18, 1951.

In 2006 the major part of the company synced with the Georgian Industrial Group and was named the Kutaisi Auto Mechanical Plant (KAMP). Today the factory produces a wide range of automotive industry parts.

Products

 КАZ-150 (Phоtо)
 KAZ-120Т (Phоtо)
 КАZ-585 (Phоtо)
 КАZ-600 (Phоtо)
 КАZ-601 (Phоtо)
 КАZ-605 Kolkhida (Phоtо)
 КАZ-606 Kolkhida experimental (Phоtо)
 КАZ-606/606А (Phоtо)
 КАZ-608 Kolkhida (Phоtо)
 КАZ-608В Kolkhida (Phоtо)
 КАZ-4502 Kolkhida (Phоtо)
 КАZ-4540 Kolkhida (Phоtо)

Gallery

References

External links
 KAMP official page

Truck manufacturers of Georgia (country)
Buildings and structures in Kutaisi
Truck manufacturers of the Soviet Union
Vehicle manufacturing companies established in 1951
1950s establishments in Georgia (country)
1951 establishments in the Soviet Union